The TVB Anniversary Award for Best Actress in a Supporting Role is one of the TVB Anniversary Awards presented annually by Television Broadcasts Limited (TVB) to recognize an actress who has delivered an outstanding performance in Hong Kong television dramas throughout the designated year. This award was not introduced to the awards ceremony until 2003, six years after its establishment. The Best Supporting Actress award was first called  the My Favourite Powerhouse Actress of the Year (本年度我最喜愛的實力非凡女藝員) in 2003. The name was changed to Best Actress in a Supporting Role (最佳女配角) in 2005.

Winners and nominees
TVB nominates at least ten actors for the category each year. The following table lists only the actors who have made it to the top five nominations during the designated awards ceremony. Top nominations were not announced in 2003, 2004, and 2015.

2000s

2010s

2020s

Records

Most wins

Most top nominations

Age superlatives

External links
Anniversary Awards  myTV SUPER

Television awards for Best Supporting Actress
TVB Anniversary Awards